How Can You Live Like That? is an album by American jazz saxophonist Eddie Harris recorded in 1976 and released on the Atlantic label.

Reception

The Allmusic review stated "Eddie Harris comes up with another LP full of abrupt changes of gear... Some of this music sounds a bit routine for Harris but the range of idioms is extraordinary and it was apparently recorded in just one day".

Track listing
All compositions by Eddie Harris except as indicated
 "How Can I Find Some Way to Tell You" (Harris, Bradley Bobo) - 5:33 
 "Love Is Too Much to Touch" (Harris, Yvonne Harris) - 2:55 
 "How Can You Live Like That?" - 5:32 
 "Get Down with It" (Harris, Bobo, Paul Humphrey, Ronald Muldrow) - 3:44 
 "I'd Love to Take You Home" (Sara E. Harris, Muldrow) - 3:36 
 "Come Dance With Me" - 4:22 
 "Bird of Stone" (Harris, Barbara Harmala) - 2:50 
 "Ambidextrous" - 3:42 
 "Nothing Else to Do" - 9:19

Personnel
Eddie Harris - tenor saxophone, piano, vocals
Ronald Muldrow - guitar, guitorgan, esophagusphone
Cedar Walton - piano (tracks 5-7 & 9)
Bradley Bobo - bass, 6 string bass, ARP synthesizer (tracks 1-4 & 9) 
Ron Carter - bass (tracks 5-7 & 9)
Richard Evans - Minimoog (track 2), arranger (tracks 1, 3, 5 & 8)
Paul Humphrey  - drums, electric drums (tracks 1-4, 6 & 8)
Billy Higgins - drums (tracks 5, 7 & 9)
Al Aarons, Oscar Brashear, Bobby Bryant, Snooky Young - trumpet (tracks 1, 3, 5 & 8) 
George Bohanon, Garnett Brown, Grover Mitchell - trombone (tracks 1, 3, 5 & 8)
Benny Powell - bass trombone (tracks 1, 3, 5 & 8)
Buddy Collette, Bill Green - alto saxophone (tracks 1, 3, 5 & 8)
John Kelson, Charles Owens - tenor saxophone (tracks 1, 3, 5 & 8)
Delbert Hill - baritone saxophone (tracks 1, 3, 5 & 8)

References 

Eddie Harris albums
1977 albums
Atlantic Records albums